Velike Žablje is a village on the southern edge of the Vipava Valley in the Municipality of Ajdovščina in the Littoral region of Slovenia.

Name
The name Velike Žablje literally means 'big Žablje', contrasting with neighboring Male Žablje (literally, 'little Žablje'). Like related toponyms (e.g., Žabnica, Žabče, and Žablje), the name is derived from the Slovene common noun žaba 'frog', referring to a settlement near a wetland where frogs live.

Church
The parish church in the settlement is dedicated to Saint Florian and belongs to the Koper Diocese.

References

External links 

Velike Žablje at Geopedia

Populated places in the Municipality of Ajdovščina